The Poplarville School District is a public school district based in Poplarville, Mississippi (USA).

In addition to Poplarville, the district serves a large portion of rural Pearl River County.

History
Initially the Lumberton Public School District was to be dissolved as of July 1, 2019, with portions going to the Lamar County School District and the Poplarville Separate School District. Lumberton was required to close due to Governor of Mississippi Phil Bryant signing Senate Bill 2500, which required consolidation, in 2016. By 2018 the Lumberton and Lamar county districts chose to do a voluntary consolidation, effective July 1, 2018, where the entirety of Lumberton students would continue going to Lumberton school buildings operated by the Lamar district. Poplarville's school board as well as the Pearl River County Board sued to stop the voluntary merger so the school district could obtain a portion of the Lumberton district, but the lawsuit was dismissed.

Awards 
Poplarville High School (PHS) was recently awarded by U.S. News and World Reports bronze medal and ranked as one of the nation’s highest performing schools. Poplarville School District was recently named an "A" rated district by national testing standards. It is one of only fifteen "A" rated districts in the state.

Schools 
The Poplarville School System's mascot is a hornet and the school colors are green and gold. Poplarville School District includes the following schools:
Poplarville High School (Grades 9–12)
Poplarville Middle School (Grades 6–8)
Poplarville Upper Elementary School (Grades 3–5)
Poplarville Lower Elementary School (Grades K-2)

Carl Merritt became Superintendent of Education for the Poplarville School District following the retirement of Supt. Gylde Fitzpatrick. The district is served by a School Board of five appointed members. Three members are appointed from the Poplarville area supervisor districts and the other two are appointed by the Poplarville Board of Aldermen.

Athletics 
Poplarville High School is home to the Poplarville Hornets. The school has football, basketball, baseball, soccer, golf, tennis, softball, and volleyball.

Demographics

2006-07 school year
There were a total of 2,193 students enrolled in the Poplarville  School District during the 2006–2007 school year. The gender makeup of the district was 47% female and 53% male. The racial makeup of the district was 13.86% African American, 85.09% White, 0.55% Hispanic, 0.32% Asian, and 0.18% Native American. 55.3% of the district's students were eligible to receive free lunch.

Previous school years

Accountability statistics

See also
List of school districts in Mississippi

References

External links
Poplarville School District

Education in Pearl River County, Mississippi
School districts in Mississippi